Good Friends is the second studio album by Australian recording artist Adam Brand. The album was released in March 2000 and peaked at number 26 on the ARIA charts. It was certified platinum in 2006.

The album was nominated for ARIA Award for Best Country Album at the ARIA Music Awards of 2000.

In January 2001, Good Friends won Brand two Country Music Awards; Album of the Year, Male Vocalist of the Year and ""Good Things in Life" won APRA Song of the Year as the same award ceremony.

Track listing

Charts

Certifications

Release history

References

2000 albums
Adam Brand (musician) albums
Mushroom Records albums